Ammonium phosphomolybdate is the inorganic salt of phosphomolybdic acid with the chemical formula (NH4)3PMo12O40. The salt contains the phosphomolybdate anion, a well known heteropolymetalate of the Keggin structural class.

Synthesis
Ammonium phosphomolybdate can be made by heating ammonium orthomolybdate combined with phosphoric acid and nitric acid, yielding ammonium nitrate, water, and a yellow precipitate of ammonium phosphomolybdate is obtained.

Normally, it often is as a hexahydrate, which is a dark yellow fine crystal, and poorly soluble in water.

References

Ammonium compounds
Molybdates
Inorganic phosphorus compounds
Heteropoly acids